Kazimierz Imieliński (6 December 1929 – 16 July 2010) was a Polish physician and the “father of Polish sexology”. Some of his monographs on sexology have been translated into foreign languages, including Czech and Russian.

References 

1929 births
2010 deaths
20th-century Polish physicians
Polish sexologists
Polish psychologists